is a station in Ōda, Shimane Prefecture, Japan.

Lines
West Japan Railway Company (JR West)
Sanin Main Line

Adjacent stations
West Japan Railway Company (JR West)

Bus terminal

Highway buses 
 Iwami Ginzan; For Iwami Kawamoto Station, Hiroshima Bus Center, and Hiroshima Station

References 

Railway stations in Japan opened in 1915
Railway stations in Shimane Prefecture
Sanin Main Line